This is a list of Punjabi films of 2018.

Box office

List of films

See also
 List of Punjabi films of 2019
 Highest grossing Punjabi films

References

2018
Lists of 2018 films by country or language
2018 in Indian cinema
2010s Punjabi-language films